Loudonville High School (LHS) is a public high school in Loudonville, Ohio, United States. It is part of the Loudonville-Perrysville Exempted Village School District.

State championships 

 Girls softball - 1993, 1997, 2002
 Girls volleyball – 1991

References

External links 
 

High schools in Ashland County, Ohio
Public high schools in Ohio